Michael Jones (born 14 November 1974) is a British former professional boxer who competed from 1997 to 2007. He held the Commonwealth super welterweight title from 2002 to 2003; the British super welterweight title from 2004 to 2005; and challenged once for the EBU European super welterweight title in 2007.

Professional boxing record

References

External links

Image - Michael Jones

1974 births
Living people
English male boxers
Light-middleweight boxers
Light-welterweight boxers
Middleweight boxers
Boxers from Liverpool
Super-middleweight boxers